Gulab Bhavan is a palace in Srinagar, India. It is a former residence of the maharaja of Jammu and Kashmir from the Dogra dynasty. The palace is in the eastern part of the city and overlooks the Dal Lake.

History 
Construction  was initially started in 1910 by Maharaja Pratap Singh as a summer residence, but it was under his successor, Maharaja Hari Singh's initiative that the major impetus to the construction of the palace was given. The Gulab Bhavan was built under the guidance of Janki Nath Madan, Royal Engineer in the court of Maharaja Hari Singh, who had received his engineering degree from Kings College, London, in 1934, with a tri pass (honours) in mathematics and physics.

After Indian independence, Maharaja Hari Singh moved to Mumbai and the palace was converted into "The Grand Palace" hotel in 1956. Bharat Hotels took over the hotel in 1998, restoring the palace and extending it. In 2008, the hotel was rebranded to LaLiT Grand Palace Srinagar, of The LaLiT Hotels, Palaces and Resorts.

References

External links 
 https://timesofindia.indiatimes.com/travel/hotels/Gulab-Bhawan/ps51719137.cms

Royal residences in India
Tourist attractions in Srinagar
Palaces in Jammu and Kashmir
Buildings and structures completed in 1910
Jammu and Kashmir (princely state)
Hotels in India
Rajput architecture
Buildings and structures in Srinagar
20th-century architecture in India